Sibaya Casino and Entertainment Kingdom is an entertainment complex situated just north of uMhlanga and south-west of eMdloti on the North Coast of KwaZulu-Natal, South Africa.

Sibaya, owned by resort hotel chain and casino destination, Sun International is one of the two casinos in Greater Durban with the other one being Suncoast located in Durban.

Design 
The casino was named Sibaya (Zulu meaning for "kraal") due to its main design and architecture centred around the Zulu culture, displaying the contemporary interpretation of African tribal designs based on traditional Zulu kraal imagery.

Its most notable Zulu-inspired architecture is its massive central domed structure is encircled by eight satellite structures with their own identities.

Building components 

Sibaya consists of the casino, two hotels- Sibaya Lodge and Royal Sibaya, foodcourt, a conference centre, Izimbo Conference Centre and a 577-seater Afro-chic theatre, iZulu Theatre.

Access 
Sibaya has a single access way, Sibaya Drive linking the casino to the N2 interchange (Exit 188) in the west and the M4 in the east. The N2 highway links Sibaya to the King Shaka International Airport and KwaDukuza in the north-west and Durban in the south-east and the M4 links Sibaya to eMdloti and Ballito in the north-east and uMhlanga and Durban in the south-west.

References 

Casinos in South Africa